Puerto Rico Highway 40 (PR-40) is an urban road in Hato Rey. This is a short road that connects from the PR-25 (Avenida Juan Ponce de León) to PR-27 (Avenida José Celso Barbosa). This road is called Avenida Quisqueya.

Major intersections

See also

 List of highways numbered 40

References

External links
 

040
Roads in San Juan, Puerto Rico